Eremo di Sant'Angelo (Italian for Hermitage of Sant'Angelo) is an hermitage located in Palombaro, Province of Chieti (Abruzzo, Italy).

History

Architecture

References

External links

 

Angelo, Palombaro
Palombaro